The Mediterranean Athletics U23 Championships is a biennial athletics competition open for under the age of 23 athletes of the opened to all affiliated Federations of the Mediterranean Athletics Union, who is the organizer. The event was first held in 2014. A Mediterranean Athletics U23 Indoor Championships was inaugurated five years later.

Editions
Outdoor

Championship records

Men

Women

Medal table

References

 
Under-23 athletics competitions
Recurring sporting events established in 2014
Sport in the Mediterranean
Athletics competitions in Europe
Athletics competitions in Africa